Kenneth Al Hahn (June 5, 1928 – August 2, 2006) was an American water polo player who competed in the 1956 Summer Olympics.

He was born in Chicago, Illinois.

Hahn was a member of the American water polo team which finished fifth in the 1956 tournament. He played one match as goalkeeper.

In 1982, he was inducted into the USA Water Polo Hall of Fame.

See also
 List of men's Olympic water polo tournament goalkeepers

References

External links
 

1928 births
2006 deaths
American male water polo players
Water polo goalkeepers
Olympic water polo players of the United States
Water polo players at the 1956 Summer Olympics
20th-century American people